Andrew "Andy" Young (born 12 February 1992) is a Scottish cross-country skier. He competed for Great Britain in the 2010 Winter Olympics in Vancouver, finishing in 74th place in the 15km freestyle. In 2008, he became the youngest skier to compete in a World Cup event.

At the 2010 Games, Young finished 14th in the team sprint event and 60th in the individual sprint event. For the FIS Nordic World Ski Championships 2009, he finished 14th in the 4 × 10 km relay and 98th in the individual sprint event.

Young also competed in the 2014 Winter Olympics, where he finished 37th in the 15km classical competition.

Young took his first top 10 finish in the Cross-Country Skiing World Cup in December 2015, when he finished in ninth place at a freestyle sprint competition in Davos, Switzerland. On 19 December 2015 he took Great Britain's first World Cup podium when he finished third in a sprint event in a 2015–16 FIS Cross-Country World Cup competition in Toblach, Italy.
Young achieved a top 10 result in December 2019, finishing 8th in the 15 km freestyle event in Davos.

Cross-country skiing results
All results are sourced from the International Ski Federation (FIS).

Olympic Games

Distance reduced to 30 km due to weather conditions.

World Championships

World Cup

Season standings

Individual podiums
 4 podiums – (3 , 1 )

Notes

External links
 
  (archive)
 
 

1992 births
Living people
Cross-country skiers at the 2010 Winter Olympics
Cross-country skiers at the 2014 Winter Olympics
Cross-country skiers at the 2018 Winter Olympics
Cross-country skiers at the 2022 Winter Olympics
Olympic cross-country skiers of Great Britain
Scottish male cross-country skiers